Santalum fernandezianum, also known as the Chile sandalwood, was a species of plant in the Santalaceae family. It was endemic to the Juan Fernández Islands off the coast of Chile. Last seen in 1908 by Carl Skottsberg, the species was cut to extinction for its aromatic wood.

References

fernandezianum
Extinct plants
Endemic flora of the Juan Fernández Islands
Taxonomy articles created by Polbot